Thomas Stone High School is a public high school in the eastern section of Waldorf, Maryland, United States, administered by the Charles County Board of Education.  The school colors are blue and gold and its mascot is the cougar. It was named after Thomas Stone, a Maryland representative in the signing of the Declaration of Independence.

History

Thomas Stone was opened in 1969.  Like Henry E. Lackey High School, it was originally constructed with some classrooms underground. It was renovated in the late 1990s, increasing its capacity from 1250 to 1600 students.  Thomas Stone is currently the third largest high school in Charles County, after North Point High School and St. Charles High School.

Sports
Thomas Stone is known for its basketball program. The boys basketball team won back to back 4A East regional titles in 2007-2008 and 2008-2009.

In the late 1980s and 1990s the baseball program was one of the top teams in the states under Coach Ed Glaser. (State Champs in 1988). Overall there have been many student athletes that have left Thomas Stone to pursue professional sports. In baseball six alumni were drafted by Major League Baseball; with Mark Calvert and Tim Drummond reaching the big league.

Alumni
Tim Drummond, professional baseball player
Robert Stethem, Navy diver and terrorism victim

Notes

Public high schools in Maryland
Schools in Charles County, Maryland
Waldorf, Maryland
Educational institutions established in 1969
1969 establishments in Maryland